Jon Kilik (born December 26, 1956) is an American film producer.  He has worked with a number of filmmakers including Spike Lee, Julian Schnabel, Gary Ross, Alejandro González Iñárritu, Jim Jarmusch, Robert Altman and Oliver Stone.

He was nominated for the Academy Award for Best Picture for producing the film Babel (2006).  He was also nominated for the BAFTA Award for Best Film for producing Babel.  He was also nominated twice for the BAFTA Award for Best Film Not in the English Language for producing the films The Diving Bell and the Butterfly (2007) and Biutiful (2010).  He was also nominated thrice for the Producers Guild of America Award for Best Theatrical Motion Picture for producing the films Babel (2006), The Diving Bell and the Butterfly (2007) and Foxcatcher (2014).  Kilik is a co-recipient of the Special Distinction Award for producing Foxcatcher (2014) at the 30th Independent Spirit Awards.  Kilik was also nominated twice for the Independent Spirit Award for Best Film for producing Before Night Falls (2000) and The Diving Bell and the Butterfly (2007).

Kilik was born in Newark, New Jersey, and grew up in Millburn.  He graduated from Millburn High School in 1974. He also attended and graduated from the University of Vermont in the 1970s.

Filmography

References

External links
 

Living people
Businesspeople from Newark, New Jersey
Film producers from New Jersey
Millburn High School alumni
University of Vermont alumni
Year of birth missing (living people)